This list of people in Playboy 1970–1979 is a catalog of women and men who appeared in Playboy magazine in the years 1970 through 1979.

Not all of these persons featured in the magazine were pictured in the nude.

Entries in blue indicate that the issue marks the original appearance of that year's Playmate of the Year (PMOY).

1970

1971

1972

1973

1974

1975

1976

1977

1978

1979

See also
 List of people in Playboy 1953–1959
 List of people in Playboy 1960–1969
 List of people in Playboy 1980–1989
 List of people in Playboy 1990–1999
 List of people in Playboy 2000–2009
 List of people in Playboy 2010–2020

References

Playboy lists
Lists of 20th-century people
1970s in mass media
1970s-related lists
Playboy